Vigarani is a surname. Notable people with the surname include:

Carlo Vigarani (1637–1713), Italian scenic designer
Lorenza Vigarani (born 1969), Italian swimmer

Italian-language surnames